Sandy Point is a city on Farm to Market Road 521 (FM 521) in north central Brazoria County, Texas, United States. The small community is located near a state prison. In the 19th century, the settlement served nearby sugar cane and cotton plantations. Sandy Point's post office, school and railroad have disappeared, but there were two churches in the community in December 2013.

History
Sandy Point incorporated in 2012 to avoid annexation from Missouri City. in 2015 Missouri City agreed to recognize the incorporation of Sandy Point.

Government and infrastructure
The Rosharon Volunteer Fire Department provides fire services for Sandy Point.

Sandy Point is located at the entrance to the Memorial Unit (formerly Darrington Unit), a prison for men operated by the Texas Department of Criminal Justice. A portion of Memorial Unit is within the Sandy Point city limits.

Demographics

Education
Students in Sandy Point are served by the Angleton Independent School District, including Angleton High School. In the 2013–2014 school year, the Angleton ISD served the area via Rosharon Zone Bus Route #223.

The Texas Legislature designated portions of Angleton ISD that by September 1, 1995 had not been annexed by Alvin Community College as in the Brazosport College zone. As Sandy Point is not in the maps of Alvin CC, it is in the Brazosport College zone.

See also

 List of cities in Texas

References

External links

Cities in Brazoria County, Texas
Cities in Texas
Populated places established in 2012